Transylvania County Airport  is a public use airport in Transylvania County, North Carolina, United States. It is located four nautical miles (7 km) east of the central business district of Brevard.

Facilities and aircraft 
It has one runway designated 9/27 with an asphalt surface measuring 2,903 by 50 feet (885 x 15 m).

For the 12-month period ending August 20, 2007, the airport had 1,315 aircraft operations, an average of 109 per month: 99% general aviation and 1% air taxi. At that time there were 47 aircraft based at this airport: 92% single-engine, 4% multi-engine, 2% glider and 2% ultralight.

References

External links 
 Aerial photo as of 25 March 1995 from USGS The National Map
 

Airports in North Carolina
Buildings and structures in Transylvania County, North Carolina
Transportation in Transylvania County, North Carolina